Çelebi is a Kurdish prominent family inhabiting the Mardin Province of southeastern Turkey. 

They were involved in a long running land dispute with the 1,600-year-old Syriac Orthodox Mor Gabriel Monastery. They were involved in the 2009 Mardin engagement ceremony massacre.

They are known for their closeness to the Turkish state. They are currently allied to the Turkish government in its fight against the insurgency of the Kurdistan Workers' Party (PKK).

Tribe member Süleyman Çelebi was a member of the Motherland Party.

References

Sources

The Making of Modern Turkey

Kurdish tribes
Kurds in Turkey
Mardin Province